Fanteakwa South is one of the constituencies represented in the Parliament of Ghana. It elects one Member of Parliament (MP) by the first past the post system of election. Fanteakwa South is located in the Fanteakwa District of the Eastern Region of Ghana.

Boundaries 
The constituency is located within the Fanteakwa District of the Eastern Region of Ghana.

Members of Parliament

See also
List of Ghana Parliament constituencies
List of political parties in Ghana

References

Parliamentary constituencies in the Eastern Region (Ghana)